Juozas Jankus  (1912 in Sereikoniai, Kovno Governorate – 1999) was a Lithuanian painter.

See also
List of Lithuanian painters

References
Universal Lithuanian Encyclopedia

1912 births
1999 deaths
People from Pasvalys District Municipality
People from Ponevezhsky Uyezd
20th-century Lithuanian painters
Stalin Prize winners
Soviet painters